Sharmin Sultana (born 1 December 1993) is a Bangladeshi cricketer who plays as a right-handed batter. She made her Women's One Day International cricket (WODI) debut against South Africa on 16 January 2017.

In June 2018, she was part of Bangladesh's squad that won their first ever Women's Asia Cup title, winning the 2018 Women's Twenty20 Asia Cup tournament. Later the same month, she was named in Bangladesh's squad for the 2018 ICC Women's World Twenty20 Qualifier tournament.

References

External links
 
 

1993 births
Living people
People from Bogra District
Bangladeshi women cricketers
Bangladesh women One Day International cricketers
Sylhet Division women cricketers
Rajshahi Division women cricketers